Milagros Witheridge also known as Maila is a Philippines international lawn and indoor bowler.

Bowls career
Witheridge won a bronze medal in the pairs at the 2012 World Outdoor Bowls Championship in Adelaide with Ainie Knight.

She has also won four medals at the Asia Pacific Bowls Championships; two silvers and a bronze in the triples events and a singles bronze medal in 2001.

References 

Living people
Filipino female lawn bowls players
Year of birth missing (living people)
Southeast Asian Games medalists in lawn bowls
Southeast Asian Games bronze medalists for the Philippines
Competitors at the 2007 Southeast Asian Games